Parafreutreta is a genus of tephritid  or fruit flies in the family Tephritidae.

Species
Parafreutreta bevisi (Munro, 1935)
Parafreutreta conferta (Bezzi, 1926)
Parafreutreta fluvialis Munro, 1940
Parafreutreta foliata Munro, 1939
Parafreutreta hirta Munro, 1939
Parafreutreta leonina Munro, 1953
Parafreutreta mavoana Munro, 1952
Parafreutreta oriens Munro, 1940
Parafreutreta pondoensis Munro, 1939
Parafreutreta pretoriae Munro, 1929
Parafreutreta producta Munro, 1957
Parafreutreta regalis Munro, 1940
Parafreutreta retisparsa Munro, 1939
Parafreutreta sobrinata Munro, 1953
Parafreutreta vumbae Hancock, 1986

References

Tephritinae
Tephritidae genera
Diptera of Africa